Horo may refer to:

Places
Horo (woreda), a woreda in Ethiopia
Horo (Eswatini), a village in Eswatini

People
Justin Horo, New Zealand Rugby League player, son of Mark Horo
Mark Horo, New Zealand rugby league footballer, father of Justin Horo
Shane Horo, former New Zealand Rugby League player, brother of Mark Horo
 Horo is also a surname in Munda community of Jharkhand, India
 Holo (alternatively romanized as "Horo"), the main character in the light novel, manga and anime series Spice and Wolf

Other
Horo (cloak), stiffened cloaks worn by messengers and bodyguards on the battlefields of feudal Japan
Horo (dance), a Bulgarian folk dance

See also
Khoro (disambiguation)
Horus